The 1936 Buffalo Bulls football team was an American football team that represented the University of Buffalo as an independent during the 1936 college football season. In their first season under head coach Jim Peele, the Bulls compiled a 5–3 record and were outscored by a total of 127 to 121. The team played its home games at Rotary Field in Buffalo, New York.

Schedule

References

Buffalo
Buffalo Bulls football seasons
Buffalo Bulls football